A Poet's Fate is a 1959 Soviet drama film directed by Boris Kimyagarov.

Plot 
The film tells about the Iranian poet Rudaki, the founder of Persian poetry.

Cast 
 Marat Aripov as Rudaki
 Nozukmo Shomansurova
 Makhmud Takhiri
 Abdulkhamid Nurmatov
 Dilbar Kasymova
 Khodzhakuli Rakhmatullaev		
 Sofia Tuibayeva
 Shamsi Dzuraev
 Mukhamejan Kasymov

References

External links 
 

1959 films
1950s Russian-language films
Soviet drama films
1959 drama films